Ganesh Asirvatham is an English language teacher from Klang, Selangor. He is a Scrabble player who represents Malaysia in international competition. He was the World Scrabble Championship 2007 runner-up. Ganesh was also the former Guinness World Record holder for the most Scrabble opponents played simultaneously by one challenger. The record took place on 7 November 2007 at the Infiniti Mall in Andheri, Mumbai, India. Ganesh beat 21 out of 25 opponents during his record attempt.

Ganesh achieved his best career WSC Rank 4 in 2005 and he had won awards in Malaysia NSC, Singapore Open and 2005 Indian Open. He is currently the top ranked player in the world according to WESPA

References

External links

Living people
Malaysian people of Indian descent
Malaysian Scrabble players
Malaysian educators
People from Selangor
Year of birth missing (living people)